20th Century Masters – The Millennium Collection: The Best of Rainbow is a compilation album released by Rainbow. Released on 3 October 2000. The tracks were recorded between 1975–1983, before Rainbow disbanded in 1984.

Track listing
"Man on the Silver Mountain" (Ritchie Blackmore, Ronnie James Dio) - 4:37
"Catch the Rainbow" (Blackmore, Dio) - 6:38
"Stargazer" (Blackmore, Dio) - 8:26
"Mistreated" (live) (Blackmore, David Coverdale) - 13:29
"Kill the King" (Blackmore, Dio, Cozy Powell) - 4:28
"Rainbow Eyes" (Blackmore, Dio) - 7:23
"Since You Been Gone" (Russ Ballard) - 3:17
"I Surrender" (Ballard) - 4:01
"Stone Cold" (Blackmore, Roger Glover, Joe Lynn Turner) - 5:17
"Power" (Blackmore, Glover, Turner) - 4:26
"Street of Dreams" (Blackmore, Turner) - 4:26

Personnel
Vocals: Ronnie James Dio (1-6), Graham Bonnet (7), Joe Lynn Turner (8-11)
Guitar: Ritchie Blackmore (1-11)
Bass: Craig Gruber (1-2), Jimmy Bain (3-4), Bob Daisley (5-6), Roger Glover (7-11)
Drums: Gary Driscoll (1-2), Cozy Powell (3-7), Bobby Rondinelli (8-10), Chuck Burgi (11)
Keyboards: Micky Lee Soule (1-2), Tony Carey (3-4), David Stone (5-6), Don Airey (7-8), David Rosenthal (9-11)

References

Rainbow
Rainbow (rock band) compilation albums
2000 greatest hits albums
Polydor Records compilation albums